Romelda Aiken-George (néé Aiken) (born 19 November 1988) is a Jamaican netball player. Aiken debuted for the Jamaica national team in 2005 as a replacement for regular shooter Elaine Davis. The  shooter rose to international prominence during the 2007 Netball World Championships. In 2008, Aiken signed with the Queensland Firebirds to play in the ANZ Championship in Australia and New Zealand.

Former Australian captain Liz Ellis has predicted that "if she [Aiken] can keep this up for a long time she will undoubtedly be one of the best [players] ever." In 2014, she became the first player to score 3500 goals in the ANZ Championship. She has won the MVP award twice, in 2008 & 2009. She also played a major role in leading the Queensland Firebirds to three premierships across her career to date. The unique 2020 Suncorp Super Netball season was notable for Aiken, where she finished first in the league for offensive rebounds (110) and second for goals scored (583). She will enter her 14th season for the Queensland Firebirds this year. 

Off the court Aiken has completed a course in both hairdressing and IT, however, has favoured her passion for coaching in the recent years. In September 2021 after the conclusion of the 2021 Suncorp Super Netball season, Aiken-George married former professional basketballer Daniel George.

References

External links
https://firebirds.net.au/player/romelda-aiken Queensland Firebirds profile]

Jamaican netball players
Queensland Firebirds players
ANZ Championship players
Commonwealth Games bronze medallists for Jamaica
Commonwealth Games medallists in netball
Netball players at the 2010 Commonwealth Games
Netball players at the 2014 Commonwealth Games
Netball players at the 2018 Commonwealth Games
1988 births
Living people
2019 Netball World Cup players
Jamaican expatriate netball people in Australia
2007 World Netball Championships players
2011 World Netball Championships players
2015 Netball World Cup players
Medallists at the 2014 Commonwealth Games
Medallists at the 2018 Commonwealth Games